Vladimir Binsol (1874 Lõhavere Parish (now Põhja-Sakala Parish), Kreis Fellin – ?) was an Estonian politician. He was a member of I Riigikogu, representing the Estonian Independent Socialist Workers' Party. He was a member of the assembly since 7 March 1922. He replaced Jakob Meerits.

References

1874 births
Year of death missing
People from Põhja-Sakala Parish
People from Kreis Fellin
Estonian Independent Socialist Workers' Party politicians
Members of the Riigikogu, 1920–1923